Ali Aftab Saeed (born 28 August 1985 in Lahore) is a Pakistani musical artist, journalist, and analyst. He was the lead vocalist for the band Beygairat Brigade.

Career
Aftab founded the band Beygairat Brigade in 2011. He was the lead vocalist of the band. The band has produced three satirical tracks. His first single, "Aalu Anday", was released in November 2011 and it got a warm reception from around Pakistan and abroad wherever people understand Urdu and Punjabi language. His second single "Pasay Ki Game" was released in March 2013. His third single "Dhinak Dhinak", was released in 2013. His most recent album Janjan Te Janazay" was released on March 2, 2019. He has co-hosted the show "With a Pinch of Salt" alongside Ayesha Noor, and later went on to co-host "Aap Janab" on AapNews. He began a series on Youtube known as "Ali Uncensored."

References

Pakistani male singers
Pakistani satirists
1985 births
Living people